The Children of Maria Morales (Spanish: "Los hijos de María Morales") is a 1952 Mexican film. It was directed by Fernando de Fuentes.

Cast
 Pedro Infante - José Morales
 Antonio Badú - Luis Morales
 Emma Roldán - María Morales
 Carmelita González - Gloria Magaña
 Irma Dorantes - María
 Josefina Leiner - Lupe
 Verónica Loyo - Lola Gómez, La Torcasa
 Andrés Soler - Carlos Salvatierra
 Tito Novaro - Tomás Gutiérrez
 José Muñoz - Bandit
 Salvador Quiroz - Don Tacho, the barman
 Lupe Inclán - Chencha
 Pepe Nava - Villager (uncredited)

External links
 

1952 films
1950s Spanish-language films
Films directed by Fernando de Fuentes
Mexican black-and-white films
1950s Mexican films